Frederick Siegel  (1861 – June 6, 1916) was a 19th-century Major League Baseball player. He played shortstop during the 1884 season for the Philadelphia Keystones of the Union Association. He appeared in eight games for the Keystones in June 1884 and had seven hits in 31 at-bats.

Sources

19th-century baseball players
Baseball players from Pennsylvania
Major League Baseball shortstops
Philadelphia Keystones players
1861 births
1916 deaths